Diploblechnum is a genus of ferns in the family Blechnaceae, subfamily Blechnoideae, according to the Pteridophyte Phylogeny Group classification of 2016 (PPG I). The genus is accepted in a 2016 classification of the family Blechnaceae, but other sources sink it into a very broadly defined Blechnum, equivalent to the whole of the PPG I subfamily.

Species
, using the PPG I classification system, the Checklist of Ferns and Lycophytes of the World accepted the following species:

Diploblechnum acuminatum (C.T.White & Goy) Gasper & V.A.O.Dittrich
Diploblechnum diversifolium (Mett.) Gasper & V.A.O.Dittrich
Diploblechnum fraseri (A.Cunn.) De Vol
Diploblechnum lenormandii (Baker) Gasper & V.A.O.Dittrich
Diploblechnum neglectum (F.M.Bailey) Gasper & V.A.O.Dittrich
Diploblechnum rosenstockii (Copel.) Gasper & V.A.O.Dittrich

References

Blechnaceae
Fern genera